Holland Park is a park in the city of Surrey, British Columbia, Canada, located within Whalley / City Centre beside Central City. Originally a piece of land that was unused and not landscaped, the city of Surrey designated the area as an urban park and was transformed in the mid-2000s. 

As the park is centrally located, it has become the focal point of a multitude of events and congregations throughout the year. The annual Fusion Festival, Surrey Pride, various music gatherings as well as other civic and cultural events have taken place within the park. In 2010, Holland Park also hosted one of the Vancouver Winter Olympics celebrations during the games. In 2015, Holland Park became the primary location for 'FVDED In The Park', western Canada's largest in city music festival, bringing in many internationally successful musicians every year, with the exception of 2023.

Amenities
 Sports Fields
 Basketball courts
 Playground
 Picnic area
 Public washroom

Transportation
Holland Park is accessible by numerous bus services including TransLink's R1 rapid bus as well as the regional SkyTrain system, with the closest station being the King George station.

Gallery

References

 

Parks in Surrey, British Columbia